Solstice is an American death metal band from Miami, Florida. They were formed in 1990 by drummer Alex Marquez and guitarists Rob Barrett and Dennis Munoz. The band has released two albums on Steamhammer Records.

Members
Current members
Dennis Muñoz - lead guitar (1990–present)
Alex Marquez - drums (1990-1997, 2011–present)
Ryan Taylor - vocals, rhythm guitar, lead guitar (2013–present)
Marcel Salas - bass (2017–present)

Former members
Rob Barrett - vocals, lead and rhythm guitar
Brian Harris - drums
Dave Smith - bass
Mark Van Erp − bass
Garrett Scott - bass
Doug Williams - bass
Christian Rudes - vocals, lead and rhythm guitar
Josh Gibbs - bass

Discography

Studio albums
 Solstice (1992)
 Pray (1995)
 To Dust (2009)
 Casting the Die (2021)

Demos
 Demo 1991 (1991)

Compilations
 Pray for the Sentencing (2012)

References

Death metal musical groups from Florida
American thrash metal musical groups
1990 establishments in Florida
Musical groups established in 1990
Musical quartets